Maurice Broun (August 27, 1906 – October 2, 1979) was an American ornithologist, botanist, naturalist, conservationist, and author.

Early life and education
He was born in New York City to parents who immigrated from Romania. Both of his parents died from tuberculosis; his mother died when he was two weeks old, and his father died when he was two years old. Living in a New York City orphanage until he was about six years old, he was taken out by a Catholic family but the mother became ill and the foster father returned Maurice to the orphanage. When he was ten years old, a Jewish family became his foster family, and the family moved to Boston. At age fourteen he became interested in bird-watching in Boston Public Garden. He ran away from his foster family when he was fifteen years old and supported himself for the rest of his life. While attending Boston English High School, he rented a room and earned a living by menial jobs.

Career
While still a high school student, he published a booklet on birds seen in Boston Public Garden. For about two years he was a bellhop at Boston's Women's City Club. When he graduated from high school, a lady whom he met while bird-watching helped him find work as an assistant to Edward Howe Forbush and John Birchard May, who were completing Forbush's Birds of Massachusetts and other New England States (3 vols., 1923–1929). After three years of work on the third volume of Forbush's book, Broun in 1929 went to work creating the Pleasant Valley Bird Sanctuary. There, from 1929 to 1932, he cut six miles of trails and built a nature museum.

While he was at Cape Cod, he met Irma Knowles Penniman (1908–1997), an ornithologist and conservationist, and married her on 15 January 1934. In 1934, the wealthy socialite, bird-watching enthusiast, and conservationist Rosalie Edge leased (with an option to buy)  to establish Hawk Mountain Sanctuary and hired Maurice and Irma Broun as game wardens to exclude hunters. The land (in Eastern Pennsylvania) was purchased. With the exception of three years from 1942 to 1945 when he was a photographer with the Seabees in the South Pacific, Broun worked as a curator of Hawk Mountain Sanctuary from 1934 until his retirement in 1966. Maurice and Irma worked as a husband and wife team at the Sanctuary until 1966 and then moved to a farm one ridge to the west of Hawk Mountain in East Brunswick Township, Pennsylvania.

Death
Broun died of cancer on October 2, 1979 at Lehigh Valley Hospital–Cedar Crest in Allentown, Pennsylvania.

See also
Edward Penniman House and Barn

References

1906 births
1979 deaths
American ornithologists
20th-century American botanists
American conservationists
20th-century American zoologists